Taperakan is a village in the Vedi Municipality of the Ararat Province of Armenia. The village used to be named for Sergey Kirov, an early Bolshevik leader.

References

External links 

World Gazeteer: Armenia – World-Gazetteer.com

Populated places in Ararat Province